Real Friends is the third studio album by American country music singer Chris Janson. It was released via Warner Records Nashville on October 18, 2019. The album contains the singles "Good Vibes" and "Done" and "Waitin' on 5".

Content
Janson produced the album with Tommy Cecil, Brock Berryhill, and Zach Crowell, who also co-wrote tracks on the album. It is also Cecil's first production credit. Blake Shelton sings duet vocals on the title track. Janson said that he wanted the album to have a positive theme, and told Billboard that "We wrote it with a positive narrative and tone all the way through."

Critical reception
Rating it 3.5 out of 5 stars, Stephen Thomas Erlewine of AllMusic said of the album that it was "a cheerful, breezy affair, filled with reassuring ballads and party tunes that mindfully avoid pressing the pedal to the metal."

Commercial performance
The album debuted at No. 12 on Billboards Top Country Albums with 3,400 copies sold. It has sold 9,900 copies in the United States as of March 2020.

Track listing

Personnel
Credits by AllMusic

Matt Alderman – background vocals
Brock Berryhill – bass guitar, acoustic guitar, electric guitar, keyboards, programming, background vocals
Jason Blaine – electric guitar
Shy Carter – background vocals
Ben Caver – background vocals
Tommy Cecil – percussion, programming, background vocals
Zach Crowell – acoustic guitar, electric guitar, keyboards, programming, background vocals
Josh Dunne – background vocals
Jerry Flowers – bass guitar
Scotty Huff – horn arrangements, trumpet
Evan Hutchings – drums, percussion
Greylon James – bass guitar, electric guitar, steel guitar
Chel  Janson – background vocals
Chris Janson – gut string guitar, lead vocals, background vocals
Georgia Janson – background vocals
Jesse Janson – background vocals
Devin Malone – banjo, dobro, acoustic guitar, electric guitar, steel guitar
James McNair – background vocals
Jovan Quallo – baritone saxophone, tenor saxophone
Josh Scalf – trombone
Justin Schipper – banjo, dobro, acoustic guitar, electric guitar, steel guitar, mandolin, slide guitar
Isaac Senty – drums, cowbell
Blake Shelton – duet vocals on "Real Friends"
Jonathan Singleton – background vocals
Aaron Sterling – drums, percussion, piano
Tim Galloway – banjo, bass guitar, bouzouki, acoustic guitar, baritone guitar, electric guitar, hi-string guitar, ukulele, background vocals
Brad Winters – background vocals
Alex Wright – clavinet, Hammond B-3 organ, omnichord, piano, synthesizer, Wurlitzer

Charts

References

2019 albums
Chris Janson albums
Warner Records albums